Katta Turk — is a town belonging to Dangʻara District of Fergana Region of the Republic of Uzbekistan. In 2009, it was given the status of a town.

References

Populated places in Fergana Region